Haystack is a project at the Massachusetts Institute of Technology to research and develop several applications around personal information management and the Semantic Web. The most notable of those applications is the Haystack client, a research personal information manager (PIM) and one of the first to be based on semantic desktop technologies. The Haystack client is published as open source software under the BSD license. 

Similar to the Chandler PIM, the Haystack system unifies handling different types of unstructured information. This information has a common representation in RDF that is presented to users in a configurable human-readable way.

Adenine 
Haystack was developed in the RDF-aware dynamic language Adenine which was created for the project.  The language was named after the nucleobase adenine and is a scripting language that is cross-platform. It is the perhaps the earliest example of a homoiconic general graph (rather than list/tree) programming language.
A substantial characteristic of Adenine is that this language possesses native support for the Resource Description Framework (RDF). The language constructs of Adenine are derived from Python and Lisp. Adenine is written in RDF and thus also can be represented and written with RDF based syntaxes such as Notation3 (N3).

Active projects and recent research papers

See also 
 SIMILE
 Chandler (software)
 Semantic desktop
 Strigi
 Beagle (software)
 Personal knowledge base
 Comparison of notetaking software

References 

 Haystack: per-user information environments. Eytan Adar, David Karger, Lynn Andrea Stein. Proceedings of the eighth international conference on Information and knowledge management, p. 413–422, November 2–06, 1999, Kansas City, Missouri, United States
 Haystack: A Platform for Creating, Organizing and Visualizing Information Using RDF. Huynh, Karger, et al.  2002
 Haystack Project summary
 Belief layer for Haystack

External links 
 Active Haystack projects 
 Haystack at the SIMILE project webpage

Free personal information managers
Massachusetts Institute of Technology software
Semantic Web